Nursing Older People is a monthly nursing journal which covers the practice of gerontological nursing. It is published by RCNi.

See also
 List of nursing journals

External links 
 

Gerontological nursing journals
English-language journals
Royal College of Nursing publications
Monthly journals